Stephen or Steven Turnbull may refer to:

Stephen Turnbull (historian) (born 1948), British academic, historian, and writer
Stephen Turnbull (footballer, born 1987), English footballer
Steven Turnbull (rugby union) (born 1987), Scottish rugby union player
Stephen Turnbull (soccer, born 1998), American soccer player